The Justice Basheer Ahmed Sayeed College for Women (formerly known as the S.I.E.T Women’s College) was established in 1955 with the aim of imparting higher education to women. The institution is maintained by the Southern India Education Trust and was founded by Justice Basheer Ahmed Sayeed.

History
Justice Basheer Ahmed Sayeed (20 February 1900 - 7 February 1984) was a lawyer who later became a Judge at the Madras High Court in 1959. He believed that the best possible service to society was to equip women students from economically and socially backward communities with education of the highest quality. This resulted in the establishment of S.I.E.T. Women’s College. In 1951, he was instrumental in establishing the Boy’s College, now known as ‘The New College’.

Academics 
The college offers undergraduate courses in Historical Studies, Political Science, Corporate Economics, English Literature, Mathematics, Physics, Chemistry, Plant Biology and Plant Biotechnology, Zoology, Advanced Zoology & Biotechnology, Nutrition, F.S.M. & Dietetics, Clinical Nutrition & Dietetics, Interior Design & Décor, Psychology, Biochemistry General, Biochemistry with Vocational Biotechnology, B.Com(general), B.Com(CS), B.Com. (Honours), Information System Management, Tourism & Travel Management, Statistics, Microbiology, Computer Science, B.C.A., Electronics and Communication Science and B.B.A.

The College offers postgraduate courses in English Literature, Counselling and Guidance / Advanced Organizational Behaviour (C&G /AOB), Applied Psychology,  Zoology, Home Science, Textile Science and Fashion Designing, Child Development & Essentials of Nutrition, M.Com., Corporate Economics, Applied Microbiology, Mathematics, Computer Science,  M.C.A., M.Com(CS) and Physics. There are also M.Phil courses in Applied Psychology (Sp. Student Counselling), Home Science, Textiles and Clothing, Human Development and Family Studies, Commerce, Zoology and Corporate Secretaryship, and Ph.D courses in Psychology (Inter-disciplinary Research), Zoology- Environmental Sciences, Aquatic Biology & Physiology, Environmental Biotechnology and Human Science.

Notable alumni
Daggubati Purandeswari, former Union Minister of State for Commerce and Industry
Bhuvana Natarajan, translator and short story writer
Sivasankari
Uma Ramanan, playback singer
Riythvika, film actress
V. J. Chitra Tamil television actress

References

External links 
 Website

Universities and colleges in Chennai
Colleges affiliated to University of Madras